George Strong may refer to:

 George Strong (VC) (1833–1888), British recipient of the Victoria Cross in the Crimean War
 George Templeton Strong (composer) (1856–1948), American composer
 George Crockett Strong (1832–1863), American major general during the American Civil War
 George Templeton Strong (1820–1875), his son, diarist during the American Civil War, worked at Cadwalader, Wickersham and Taft
 George Veazey Strong (1880–1946), U.S. general during World War II
 George Strong (footballer) (1916–1989), English association football player